Tlalli  was a proposed sculpture of a large indigenous woman's head by contemporary artist Pedro Reyes. It was proposed to replace the Monument to Christopher Columbus along Mexico City's Paseo de la Reforma.

Tlalli was inspired by the Olmec colossal heads and its intention was to honor 500 years of the resistance of indigenous women. The mayor of Mexico City, Claudia Sheinbaum, announced on 5 September 2021 that Tlalli would replace the monument to Columbus. The announcement, design, name, and the selection of Reyes as the sculptor, as well the undiscussed removal of Columbus, received mixed opinions. Days later, Sheinbaum said that a committee would determine its future, and then in October stated a copy of The Young Woman of Amajac will be placed there instead.

Although the government of the city never addressed the project as canceled, journals and academic members consider it as such. According to the city's Secretary of Culture, Claudia Curiel de Icaza, the project is still under consideration but The Young Woman of Amajac has higher priority.

Background

The head was set to replace a monument to Christopher Columbus, originally located on a roundabout along Paseo de la Reforma Avenue, in Cuauhtémoc, Mexico City. The statue of Columbus was removed on 10 October 2020, prior to an attempted demonstration to topple it two days later—on Columbus Day. According to the government of the city, it was removed as part of a series of restorations performed by the National Institute of Anthropology and History (INAH). Mayor Claudia Sheinbaum said public debates would be held in 2021 to determine the future of the monument.

In the context of the commemorations of the 500th anniversary of the Fall of Tenochtitlan, the capital of the Aztecs and present day Mexico City, the city government announced several changes and celebrations to take place in 2021. Among them were the renaming of the plazas and a metro station to include a pre-conquest point of view. For example the renaming of Puente de Alvarado (named after the Spanish conquistador Pedro de Alvarado) to Avenida México-Tenochtitlan.

On 5 September 2021, International Indigenous Women's Day, Sheinbaum announced that the statue of Columbus would not be returned to its original site. Instead, it would be relocated to American Park in Polanco, Miguel Hidalgo. She also said that Tlalli would replace the statue of Columbus, to honor 500 years of the resistance of indigenous women, and that the relocation was not to "erase history" but to "deliver social justice". She also mentioned that the decision was taken after receiving 5,000 signatures from indigenous women who asked to "decolonize Paseo de la Reforma".

Description
The sculpture was proposed to be made of volcanic rock and it was being sculpted in three workshops located in Iztapalapa, Chimalhuacán and Coyoacán by women artisans and sculptors. The sculpture was based on the Olmecs, a pre-Columbian civilization that developed during the Mesoamerican Preclassic Era. The word Tlalli means "land" or "earth" in Nahuatl. Reyes was inspired by the Olmec colossal heads, and according to him, he had difficulties transforming Tlalli into a woman since the original heads were based on men.

The eyes were inspired by those of a jaguar and her lips on two snakes. For the hair, a pair of braids that converge at a point at the occipital bone were chosen to form a representation of Nahui Ollin, the Earthquake Sun. According to Reyes, he first designed her to have a bun but he was told by anthropologists that pre-Hispanic cultures used braids which imitated the appearance of ergots.

Reception
The initial announcement received mixed reactions. Mexican president Andres Manuel López Obrador approved of the decision to use the sculpture. The choice of Reyes as the sculptor received criticism, namely, for the fact that he is not a woman and he is not indigenous. Aguilar also criticized the generalization of women in public sculpture, in comparison to men who are individually honored. Researcher Lucía Melgar added that it represents women as "generic, mute and immobilized". Historian  said it exemplifies how indigenous people are viewed with an "essentialist view that [they are] all the same".

More than 300 people linked to art and culture signed a petition for Sheinbaum requesting the exclusion of Reyes from the project and the creation of a committee composed of women from indigenous communities to choose a monument that represents them. Reyes explained that the government chose him because there are few monumental stonecutters in the country and that the project had to be completed before March 2022. Due to the controversy, Sheinbaum determined that the Committee for Monuments and Artistic Works in Public Spaces (Comité de Monumentos y Obras Artísticas en Espacios Públicos, COMAEP) will determine which is the most appropriate option to replace Columbus.

As a response, on 25 September 2021, a group of feminists placed a purple wooden woman with her fist raised on the empty Columbus plinth. They symbolically re-named the intersection the "" (Women Who Fight Roundabout). Additionally, they painted the names of murdered and disappeared women on the metal police barricades.

Replacements
On 12 October, Sheinbaum proposed an enlarged copy of The Young Woman of Amajac to replace the statue of Columbus. Reyes exhibited Citlalli (Nahuatl for Star) at the Museum of Contemporary Art of Monterrey in March 2022 which, according to him, is a version similar to Tlalli. The following month a six-meter version of Citlalli was exhibited in San Antonio, Texas.

See also

 2021 in art
 Feminist art
 Indigenismo in Mexico

Notes

References

Further reading

External links 
 "Pedro Reyes: Tlali", a 2021 exhibition by Reyes at Lisson Gallery.

2021 in Mexico
Busts in Mexico
Controversies in Mexico
Indigenous peoples in Mexico City
Lava rock buildings and structures
Outdoor sculptures in Mexico City
Paseo de la Reforma
Proposed buildings and structures in Mexico
Sculptures of women in Mexico
Snakes in art
Stone sculptures